From the 1880s to 1910s, the Italian Regia Marina (Royal Navy) built or purchased twenty protected cruisers; the earliest vessels were either built or designed in Britain, though later vessels were constructed in Italy, to Italian designs. Italian naval strategists quickly discarded the concept and returned to more traditional strategies centered on a fleet of battleships. As a result, later cruisers returned to medium-caliber batteries.

One vessel, was an exception to Italian design preferences. The ship had been ordered by the Ottoman Navy, but the Ottomans failed to pay for the ship, so she remained incomplete until the Italo-Turkish War in 1911, when she was seized by Italy and completed for the Regia Marina.

Italian protected cruisers served in many roles across the globe. Many were deployed to Italy's colonies in Africa, or to foreign stations in the Americas and Asia to show the flag. They were also assigned to the main fleet in the Mediterranean, where they served as scouts. As the vessels aged, many were converted for secondary duties, becoming training ships, depot ships, and headquarters ships. Many of the early vessels saw action during the Italo-Turkish War, bombarding Ottoman positions in North Africa and the Arabian Peninsula and blockading ports in the Red Sea. During World War I, most of the vessels saw little action, owing to the cautious strategy adopted by both Italy and Austria-Hungary, but Quarto battled an Austro-Hungarian cruiser in 1915 and Marsala took part in the Battle of the Strait of Otranto in May 1917. After the war, most of the remaining vessels were scrapped or reduced to secondary roles, having been supplanted by ex-German and Austro-Hungarian vessels taken as war prizes and newer light cruisers built in the 1920s.

Giovanni Bausan

Giovanni Bausan was the first protected cruiser built for the Italian Regia Marina (Royal Navy). The ship was designed by George Rendel at the Armstrong Whitworth shipyard in Britain; the design was based on the Chilean . Equipped with a pair of  guns, Giovanni Bausan was intended as a "battleship destroyer", since these weapons would be able to defeat the heavy armor of the much larger—and much more expensive—battleships in foreign navies. She nevertheless proved to be unsatisfactory for this role, since the guns fired too slowly and she was too unstable to be a good gunnery platform. Construction of the ship—along with the subsequent Etna class, for which Giovanni Bausan provided the basis—represented the Regia Marinas brief experimentation with the Jeune École doctrine.

Giovanni Bausan frequently served abroad. She participated in the conquest of Eritrea in 1887–1888 as the flagship of the Italian squadron during the campaign. She took part in the Venezuelan crisis of 1902–1903 alongside several other Italian, British, and German warships. The ship was withdrawn from front-line service by 1905 and was employed as a training ship. During the Italo-Turkish War of 1911–1912, she provided gunfire support to Italian troops ashore in North Africa. By the outbreak of World War I, Giovanni Bausan had been relegated to secondary duties, first as a distilling ship, and later as a depot ship for seaplanes. The ship was disarmed during the conflict and ultimately was sold to ship-breakers in March 1920.

Etna class

The Etna class was an improved version of the preceding Giovanni Bausan, being slightly larger but carrying the same armament and armor protection. License-built variants of the earlier ship, they were partially designed by George Rendel, who had also designed Giovanni Bausan. As such, they suffered from the same limitations as the earlier vessel that were imposed by their slow-firing 10-inch guns and poor stability.

The four cruisers nevertheless had long service lives, which included periods with the main Italian fleet as well as on foreign stations. Etna served on the North American Station from 1893 to 1895, and in 1899, Ettore Fieramosca, Vesuvio, and Stromboli participated in the suppression of the Boxer Uprising in China. Etna was rebuilt into a training ship in 1905–1907, and in 1909 she took part in the Hudson–Fulton Celebration. Ettore Fieramosca was the first member of the class to be decommissioned, and she was sold for scrap in 1909. Stromboli followed in 1911 and Vesuvio was discarded in 1915. Etna remained in service longer than her sisters; she saw action during the Italo-Turkish War, and during World War I, she served as the headquarters ship in Taranto. She was ultimately discarded in 1921.

Dogali

Dogali was originally designed by William Henry White of Armstrong Whitworth for the Greek Navy. She was initially named Salamis, but the Greek Navy put the ship up for sale while she was still under construction. Italy purchased the vessel and renamed her Angelo Emo and then Dogali before she entered service. Her career was uneventful, with her early years spent with the main fleet conducting training exercises. In 1893 she represented Italy at the World's Columbian Exposition, and was present in Brazil during the Revolta da Armada (Revolt of the Fleet), where she protected Italian interests from the unrest. In 1908, Italy sold Dogali to Uruguay, and she was renamed 25 de Agosto. In 1911, she became Montevideo, and she was decommissioned in 1914. She remained in the Uruguayan Navy's inventory until 1932, when she was sold for scrap.

Piemonte

Piemonte, designed by Philip Watts at Armstrong Whitworth, was based on the preceding Dogali. Originally intended to carry a pair of  guns and four  guns, the Italian Navy instead requested a uniform battery of six 6-inch guns. She proved to be a revolutionary vessel, as she was the first major warship to be armed entirely with quick-firing, medium-caliber guns; these became the standard for all cruisers from the 1890s onward.

The ship had an eventful career. She was briefly assigned to the main fleet, but by the early 1890s, she was serving abroad in the Red Sea and Indian Ocean. In 1896 she was sent to Brazil to protect Italian nationals in the country after unrest in the country targeted Europeans. By 1901, Piemonte was assigned to the East Asia Station. By the outbreak of the Italo-Turkish War, the ship was again stationed in the Red Sea. She led a pair of destroyers in the Battle of Kunfuda Bay, where she sank or destroyed seven Ottoman gunboats, destroying Ottoman naval strength in the area. For the rest of the war, she blockaded and bombarded Ottoman ports. During World War I, she was assigned to the Second Fleet, based in Brindisi, but she did not see action. Piemonte was sold for scrap in 1920.

Regioni class

The six Regioni-class cruisers—so named as all vessels save Elba were named for regions of Italy—were the first protected cruisers designed by Italian naval architects. They were built by four different shipyards, and so varied slightly in size, speed, and armament. They proved to be a disappointment in service, owing to their slow speed and weak armor protection.

They served in a variety of capacities throughout their careers, including scouts for the main fleet, colonial cruisers, and representatives of Italy at major foreign events. While on the China Station, Elba observed the Russo-Japanese War, including the Battle of Chemulpo Bay in 1904, where she picked up Russian survivors. Lombardia was converted into a depot ship for submarines in 1906. Elba and Liguria were equipped with observation balloons in 1907–1908. In 1910, Umbria was sold to Haiti and renamed Consul Gostrück, though she quickly sank under the care of her inexperienced crew.

The remaining ships, except for Lombardia, took part in the Italo-Turkish War. They were relegated to secondary roles during World War I, except for Puglia, which battled the Austro-Hungarian cruiser  and later covered the evacuation of the Serbian Army from Durazzo. Etruria was deliberately blown up by Italy as a deception operation against Austria-Hungary. The remaining ships were broken up for scrap in the early 1920s, though the bow section of Puglia is preserved at the Vittoriale degli italiani, a museum in Lombardy.

Calabria

Calabria was designed for use in Italy's colonial empire, rather than the earlier vessels intended as fleet scouts. As such, her steel hull was sheathed with wood and then a layer of zinc to protect it from fouling during lengthy tours in the overseas colonies. Additionally, she was equipped with less powerful though more efficient engines than the earlier cruisers. The ship was otherwise similar to preceding designs like the Regioni class, having a displacement only slightly lower and a nearly identical gun battery.

The ship's career spanned the globe, and ranged from a deployment to China to help suppress the Boxer Uprising in 1899–1901, to tours in the Americas throughout the 1900s, and a trip to Australia in 1905. During the Italo-Turkish War, she was transferred to the Red Sea, where she bombarded Ottoman troops and ports and helped to enforce a blockade before returning to Italy in April 1912 for a refit. The ship continued to serve in the Red Sea during World War I and as a result, did not see action. She was reclassified as a gunboat in 1921 and then a training ship in early 1924, before being sold for scrap in November 1924.

Libia

Libia marked a major advancement over earlier designs, owing in large part due to the fact that the ship was originally ordered by the Ottoman Navy. Based on the British-built , the ship was to have been named Drama, but the Ottoman government failed to make payments so construction stopped, and she was seized after the outbreak of the Italo-Turkish War and completed for the Regia Marina. She was significantly larger, faster, and more heavily armored than the other Italian protected cruisers, but she carried a weaker main battery.

As a scout for the main fleet, Libia spent much of World War I in port, acting as a fleet in being to deter the Austro-Hungarian Navy from attempting any major operations. In 1921 the ship went on a world tour under the command of Admiral Ernesto Burzagli. During the cruise, she stopped in San Francisco, United States in November, where she stayed for a month. While there, she was filmed for a short documentary by the then-unknown film director Frank Capra on 6 and 7 November—though it did not generate much attention, it was Capra's first publicly screened film. She was deployed to China in 1925, where she was stationed until the early 1930s. After returning to Italy and being laid up in 1935, Libia was eventually sold for scrap in March 1937.

Quarto

Quarto represented another major shift in Italian cruiser designs; unlike earlier designs that attempted to fill multiple roles, Quarto was optimized for use as a fleet scout. She also incorporated advances like steam turbines and mixed oil and coal-fired boilers, which produced a much higher top speed. Intended to engage only hostile scouts, her armament was significantly weaker than earlier cruisers, mounting a battery of only 4.7-inch guns. She was also fitted with equipment to handle 200 naval mines to allow her to serve as a fast minelayer. Unlike many of her fellow cruisers, Quarto was quite active during World War I, as she was stationed at Brindisi to support the Otranto barrage. While on patrols throughout the war, she encountered Austro-Hungarian and German U-boats, though they frequently misjudged her speed, causing them to miss with their torpedoes. She engaged in a long gunnery duel with the Austro-Hungarian cruiser  in December 1915, but neither vessel was seriously damaged. Quarto supported Italian forces during the Second Italo-Ethiopian War in 1935–1936, before serving as the flagship of Italian forces participating in the non-intervention patrols in 1936 and 1937 during the Spanish Civil War. Stricken from the naval register in January 1939, she was thereafter allocated for weapons testing. The commando unit Decima Flottiglia MAS tested new SLC human torpedoes and MT explosive motorboats on Quarto in 1940, the latter causing extensive damage and sinking the ship in November.

Nino Bixio class

The Regia Marina decided to follow Quarto with two more similar ships, which became the Nino Bixio class. These two ships carried an identical armament and the same scale of armor protection. They were significantly heavier and had one fewer turbine, though, and this resulted in poor performance. During World War I, the two ships were based at Brindisi with Quarto, where they patrolled the southern end of the Adriatic Sea, though Nino Bixio did not see action in the conflict. Marsala was the only Italian cruiser at Brindisi to have steam in her boilers when an Austro-Hungarian cruiser flotilla attacked the Otranto barrage in May 1917; she briefly engaged the hostile vessels in the Battle of the Strait of Otranto before the Austro-Hungarians withdrew. Both ships were discarded in the late 1920s.

Campania class

The last pair of protected cruisers built by the Italian Navy were intended for colonial service, and were based on experience from Calabria. They were given a relatively heavy main battery for their small size and a long cruising range, at the expense of armor protection and speed. The ships were so small that they could be built on the same slipway and launched the same day. Since they had been launched less than a week before hostilities broke out at the end of July 1914, fitting-out work was delayed by a steel shortage, particularly after Italy entered the war. Campania and Basilicata initially served in Libya; neither had eventful careers. The latter vessel was destroyed by a boiler explosion in Tewfik on 13 August 1919. Campania was reclassified as a gunboat in 1921 and became a training ship in 1932. She ultimately was sold for scrap in 1937.

During the war, Italy stopped building cruisers, since destroyers, submarines, and smaller patrol vessels were more useful in operations against the Austro-Hungarians. After the war, the anemic Italian economy could not support significant naval construction programs. Additionally, Italy had received several modern light cruisers from the defeated Germans and Austro-Hungarians, and these ships formed the backbone of the Italian cruiser force.

See also
 List of heavy cruisers of Italy
 List of torpedo cruisers of Italy

Notes

References

External links
 Incrociatori Marina Militare website 

Italy
Cruisers of Italy
Cruisers